The 2022 Atlantic hurricane season saw an average number of named storms and hurricanes, and below average number major hurricanes (category 3 or higher on the 5-level Saffir–Simpson wind speed scale). There were fourteen named storms during the season; eight of them strengthened into a hurricane, and two of those reached major hurricane intensity. The season officially began on June 1, and ended on November 30. These dates, adopted by convention, historically describe the period in each year when most subtropical or tropical cyclogenesis occurs in the Atlantic Ocean. No subtropical or tropical development occurred in the Atlantic prior to the start of the season, making this the first since 2014 not to have a pre-season named storm. The season's first storm, Tropical Storm Alex, formed on June 5, and the last, Hurricane Nicole, dissipated on November 11.

This timeline documents tropical cyclone formations, strengthening, weakening, landfalls, extratropical transitions, and dissipations during the season. It includes information that was not released throughout the season, meaning that data from post-storm reviews by the National Hurricane Center, such as a storm that was not initially warned upon, has been included.

By convention, meteorologists use one time zone when issuing forecasts and making observations: Coordinated Universal Time (UTC), and also use the 24-hour clock (where 00:00 = midnight UTC). The National Hurricane Center uses both UTC and the time zone where the center of the tropical cyclone is currently located. The time zones utilized (east to west) are: Greenwich, Cape Verde, Atlantic, Eastern, and Central. In this timeline, all information is listed by UTC first, with the respective regional time zone included in parentheses. Additionally, figures for maximum sustained winds and position estimates are rounded to the nearest 5 units (knots, miles, or kilometers), following National Hurricane Center practice. Direct wind observations are rounded to the nearest whole number. Atmospheric pressures are listed to the nearest millibar and nearest hundredth of an inch of mercury.

Timeline

June
June 1
 The 2022 Atlantic hurricane season officially begins.

June 5

 18:00 UTC (2:00 p.m.

June 6
 00:00 UTC (8:00 p.m.
 12:00 UTC (8:00 a.m.

July
July 1

July 2
 12:00 UTC (7:00 a.m.
 18:00 UTC (2:00 p.m. EDT) at Tropical Storm Colin weakens to a tropical depression inland and later dissipates over northeastern South Carolina.

August
No tropical cyclones formed in the basin during the month of August.

September
September 1
 06:00 UTC (2:00 a.m.
 12:00 UTC (12:00 p.m. GMT) at Tropical Depression Five strengthens into Tropical Storm Danielle west of the Azores.

September 2
 12:00 UTC (12:00 p.m.

September 3
 03:00 UTC (11:00 p.m. AST, September 2) at   Tropical Storm Earl forms from a low-pressure system about 185 mi (295 km) east of the northern Leeward Islands.
 06:00 UTC (6:00 a.m. GMT) at Hurricane Danielle weakens to a tropical storm west of Flores Island.

September 4

 00:00 UTC (8:00 p.m. AST, September 3) at Tropical Storm Danielle re-strengthens into a Category 1 hurricane west of Flores Island.
 18:00 UTC (6:00 p.m.

September 7
 00:00 UTC (8:00 p.m. AST, September 6) at   Tropical Storm Earl intensifies into a Category 1 hurricane about 550 mi (885 km) south of Bermuda.
 12:00 UTC (12:00 p.m.

September 8
 03:00 UTC (11:00 p.m. AST, September 7) at   Hurricane Earl intensifies into a Category 2 hurricane about 355 mi (570 km) south of Bermuda.
 06:00 UTC (6:00 a.m. GMT) at Hurricane Danielle weakens to a tropical storm north of Flores Island.
 12:00 UTC (12:00 p.m.

September 9
 03:00 UTC (11:00 p.m. AST, September 8) at   Hurricane Earl weakens to a Category 1 hurricane about 95 mi (150 km) southeast of Bermuda.
 09:00 UTC (5:00 a.m. AST) at   Hurricane Earl re-strengthens to a Category 2 hurricane about 140 mi (230 km) east-northeast of Bermuda.
 21:00 UTC (5:00 p.m.

September 10
 15:00 UTC (11:00 a.m. AST) at   Hurricane Earl weakens to a Category 1 hurricane about 260 mi (420 km) south of Cape Race, Newfoundland.
 21:00 UTC (5:00 p.m. AST) at   Hurricane Earl transitions into a hurricane-force extratropical low about 215 mi (345 km) south of Cape Race.

September 14
 15:00 UTC (11:00 a.m. AST) at   Tropical Depression Seven forms about 805 mi (1300 km) east of the Leeward Islands.

September 15
 01:45 UTC (9:45 p.m. AST, September 14) at   Tropical Depression Seven strengthens into Tropical Storm Fiona about 645 mi (1040 km) east of the Leeward Islands.

September 18
 15:00 UTC (11:00 a.m. AST) at   Tropical Storm Fiona strengthens into a Category 1 hurricane about 50 mi (80 km) south of Ponce, Puerto Rico.
 19:20 UTC (3:20 p.m.

September 19
 07:30 UTC (3:30 a.m.
 21:00 UTC (5:00 p.m. AST) at   Hurricane Fiona intensifies into a Category 2 hurricane about 130 mi (205 km) southeast of Grand Turk Island.

September 20
 06:00 UTC (2:00 a.m. EDT) at   Hurricane Fiona intensifies into a Category 3 hurricane about 45 mi (70 km) south-southeast of Grand Turk.
 12:00 UTC (8:00 a.m.
 18:00 UTC (2:00 p.m. AST) at Tropical Depression Eight strengthens into Tropical Storm Gaston.

September 21
 06:00 UTC (2:00 a.m. EDT) at   Hurricane Fiona intensifies into a Category 4 hurricane about 105 mi (170 km) north of North Caicos Island.

September 22
 18:00 UTC (6:00 p.m.

September 23

 00:00 UTC (8:00 p.m. AST, September 22) at   Hurricane Fiona attains peak intensity with maximum sustained winds of 130 mph (215 km/h) and a minimum barometric pressure of 932 mbar (27.52 inHg) about 280 mi (455 km) west-southwest of Bermuda.
 09:00 UTC (5:00 a.m. AST) at   Hurricane Fiona weakens to a Category 3 hurricane about 155 mi (250 km) northwest of Bermuda.
 09:00 UTC (5:00 a.m. AST) at   Tropical Depression Nine forms about 615 mi (985 km) east-southeast of Kingston, Jamaica.
 12:00 UTC (11:00 a.m.
 15:00 UTC (11:00 a.m. AST) at   Hurricane Fiona re-strengthens into a Category 4 hurricane about 250 mi (405 km) north of Bermuda.
 18:00 UTC (5:00 p.m.
 21:00 UTC (5:00 p.m. AST) at   Hurricane Fiona weakens to a Category 3 hurricane about 370 mi (595 km) south-southeast of Halifax, Nova Scotia.

September 24
 03:00 UTC (11:00 p.m. AST, September 23) at   Hurricane Fiona transitions into a post-tropical cyclone with Category 2-strength winds about 140 mi (220 km) east of Halifax; hours later it makes landfall in eastern Nova Scotia and then on Cape Breton Island with hurricane strength winds.
 03:00 UTC (11:00 p.m. EDT, September 23) at   Tropical Depression Nine strengthens into Tropical Storm Ian about 385 mi (625 km) southeast of Kingston.
 12:00 UTC (11:00 a.m.

September 25
 00:00 UTC (11:00 p.m.

September 26
 00:00 UTC (12:00 a.m. GMT) at Tropical Storm Gaston transitions into a post-tropical cyclone, and subsequently dissipates.
 09:00 UTC (5:00 a.m. EDT) at   Tropical Storm Ian strengthens into a Category 1 hurricane about 90 mi (150 km) southwest of Grand Cayman.
 21:00 UTC (5:00 p.m. EDT) at   Hurricane Ian strengthens into a Category 2 hurricane about 155 mi (250 km) southeast of the western tip of Cuba.

September 27
 06:30 UTC (2:30 a.m. EDT) at   Hurricane Ian strengthens into a Category 3 hurricane about 35 mi (55 km) south of Pinar del Río, Cuba.
 08:30 UTC (4:30 a.m. EDT) at   Hurricane Ian makes landfall near La Coloma, Cuba, with sustained winds of 125 mph (205 km/h).

September 28

 00:00 UTC (8:00 p.m.
 02:00 UTC (10:00 p.m. EDT, September 27) at   Hurricane Ian passes directly over Dry Tortugas National Park in the Florida Keys with sustained winds of 120 mph (195 km/h).
 09:00 UTC (5:00 a.m. EDT) at   Hurricane Ian intensifies into a Category 4 hurricane about 75 mi (125 km) west-southwest of Naples, Florida.
 10:35 UTC (6:35 a.m.
 19:10 UTC (3:10 p.m.
 20:35 UTC (4:35 p.m.
 23:00 UTC (7:00 p.m. EDT) at   Hurricane Ian weakens to a Category 3 hurricane inland about 25 mi (40 km) northeast of Punta Gorda.

September 29
 01:00 UTC (9:00 p.m.
 03:00 UTC (11:00 p.m.
 09:00 UTC (5:00 a.m.
 12:00 UTC (8:00 a.m.
 21:00 UTC (5:00 p.m.

September 30
 18:05 UTC (2:05 p.m.
 21:00 UTC (5:00 p.m.

October
October 4
 12:00 UTC (8:00 a.m.

October 7
 00:00 UTC (8:00 p.m.
 00:00 UTC (8:00 p.m.
 03:00 UTC (11:00 p.m. AST, October 6) at Tropical Depression Thirteen makes landfall near Adicora, Venezuela.
 08:30 UTC (4:30 a.m. AST) at Tropical Depression Thirteen makes landfall near Punta Espada, Colombia.
 12:00 UTC (8:00 a.m.

October 9

 00:00 UTC (8:00 p.m.
 06:00 UTC (2:00 a.m.
 07:15 UTC (3:15 a.m. EDT) at Hurricane Julia makes landfall near Laguna de Perlas, Nicaragua, north of Bluefields, at peak intensity.
 18:00 UTC (1:00 p.m.

October 11
 12:00 UTC (7:00 a.m.
 18:00 UTC (1:00 p.m. CDT) at The tropical depression strengthens into Tropical Storm Karl.

October 12
 18:00 UTC (1:00 p.m.

October 14
 06:00 UTC (1:00 a.m.

October 15
 00:00 UTC (7:00 p.m.

October 31
 12:00 UTC (8:00 a.m.

November
November 1

 12:00 UTC (8:00 a.m.

November 2
 12:00 UTC (7:00 a.m.
 12:00 UTC (8:00 a.m.
 21:30 UTC (4:30 p.m.

November 3
 06:00 UTC (1:00 a.m. CDT) at Hurricane Lisa weakens to a tropical storm inland over Central America.
 06:00 UTC (6:00 a.m.
 12:00 UTC (7:00 a.m. CDT) at Tropical Storm Lisa weakens to a tropical depression inland near the northwestern Guatemala–Mexico border.
 12:00 UTC (12:00 p.m.

November 5
 12:00 UTC (7:00 a.m.

November 7
 09:00 UTC (5:00 a.m. AST) at   Subtropical Storm Nicole forms about 555 mi (895 km) east of the northwestern Bahamas.

November 8

 15:00 UTC (10:00 a.m. EST) at   Subtropical Storm Nicole transitions into a tropical storm about 350 mi (560 km) northeast of the northwestern Bahamas.

November 9
 16:55 UTC (11:55 a.m. EST) at   Tropical Storm Nicole makes landfall at Marsh Harbour, Great Abaco Island, Bahamas, with sustained winds of 70 mph (110 km/h).
 23:00 UTC (6:00 p.m. EST) at   Tropical Storm Nicole strengthens into a Category 1 hurricane while simultaneously making landfall on Grand Bahama, about 25 mi (40 km) east-northeast of Freeport, Bahamas, with sustained winds of 75 mph (120 km/h).

November 10
 08:00 UTC (3:00 a.m. EST) at   Hurricane Nicole makes landfall on North Hutchinson Island, about 15 mi (25 km) north-northwest of Fort Pierce, Florida, with sustained winds of 75 mph (120 km/h).
 09:00 UTC (4:00 a.m. EST) at   Hurricane Nicole weakens to a tropical storm about 25 mi (35 km) northwest of Vero Beach, Florida.
 21:00 UTC (4:00 p.m. EST) at   Tropical Storm Nicole makes landfall about 95 mi (155 km) southeast of Tallahassee, Florida, with sustained winds of 45 mi (75 km/h), after briefly emerging over the Gulf of Mexico.

November 11
 03:00 UTC (10:00 p.m. EST, November 10) at   Tropical Storm Nicole weakens to a tropical depression about 20 mi (35 km) north of Tallahassee.
 21:00 UTC (4:00 p.m. EST) at   Tropical Depression Nicole transitions into a post-tropical cyclone about 55 mi (85 km) south-southwest of Charleston, West Virginia.

November 30
 The 2022 Atlantic hurricane season officially ends.

See also

 Timeline of the 2022 Pacific hurricane season
 Tropical cyclones in 2022
 Lists of Atlantic hurricanes

Notes

References

External links

 2022 Tropical Cyclone Advisory Archive, National Hurricane Center and Central Pacific Hurricane Center, noaa.gov

2022
2022
Articles which contain graphical timelines